Freddie Portelli (born 5 May 1944 at St. Paul's Bay, Malta) is a Maltese singer and songwriter.

Portelli's career has spanned over 40 years, and began as a member and chief songwriter of the group, The Malta Bums. He toured America, Canada and Germany with the group for 5 months, and after returning to Malta in 1966, wrote the song "Viva Malta", and later, "Mur Hallini". His recordings have been released in Australia, Canada, America and England. Freddie  was also the leader of the legendary band "Black Train" with whom he released self penned hit records.

Portelli was a national waterpolo player, has been involved with his home town's Sirens Waterpolo team also with Neptunes and Valletta and has won the premier championships with every new team he joined, he was an effective player with Malta's national team who won the international Independence Tournament cup in 1964 in the same year he won the premier championship with Neptions, Freddie Portelli was awarded gieh ir republika by the president of Malta also awarded the golden medal and gieh San Pawl il Bahar, awarded best Maltese record seller, awarded lifetime achievement, his biography soon to be released in Book titled Freddie Portelli 'il kbir ghadu gej"

References

1944 births
Living people
Maltese musicians
Maltese singer-songwriters